Blomidon is a community in the Canadian province of Nova Scotia, located in Kings County on the Blomidon Peninsula near Cape Blomidon  .

References

  Blomidon on Destination Nova Scotia

Communities in Kings County, Nova Scotia